Rodney Coe (born May 18, 1993) is a former American football defensive tackle in the National Football League for the Tampa Bay Buccaneers, Jacksonville Jaguars, Seattle Seahawks and Detroit Lions. He played college football at the University of Akron.

Early years
Coe attended Edwardsville High School, where he was a two-way player at running back and linebacker. As a sophomore, he appeared in 5 games, registering 118 carries for 912 yards and 9 touchdowns.

As a junior, he appeared in 10 games, tallying 106 carries for 978 yards and 12 touchdowns. He received Telegraph Player of the Year honors. As a senior, he was limited with injuries. He only played in 2 games, collecting 44 carries for 230 yards and 3 touchdowns.

College career
After being recruited by Iowa, Coe decided to attend Iowa Western Community College to improve his grades and further his football career as a running back. As a freshman, he had 80 carries for 468 yards and 9 touchdowns.

As a sophomore, he was converted into a defensive tackle, registering 42 tackles (9 for loss), 1,5 sacks and 2 forced fumbles, while receiving second-team all-conference honors. He contributed to the team having an undefeated season (12-0) and winning the JUCO National Championship. In the title game he had 7 tackles (one for loss).

After two years, Coe committed to Iowa State. As a junior, he started the last four games, finishing the season with 37 tackles (4.5 tackles for loss) and 2 passes defensed. On March 24, 2014, Coe was dismissed from the Iowa State team by head coach Paul Rhoads for a violation of team rules.

Coe chose to end his college career for the Akron Zips football team. He sat out the 2014 season to comply with NCAA transfer rules.

As a senior, he contributed to the team having an 8-5 record and winning its first FBS bowl (Famous Idaho Potato Bowl). He started 11 out of 12 games at defensive tackle, making 46 tackles (8.5 for loss), 2 sacks, 3 quarterback hurries, 3 passes defensed and one fumble recovery,

Professional career

Dallas Cowboys
Coe was signed as an undrafted free agent by the Dallas Cowboys after the 2016 NFL Draft on May 6. He was released by the Cowboys during final roster cuts on September 3.

Tampa Bay Buccaneers
On September 14, 2016, Coe was signed to the Tampa Bay Buccaneers' practice squad. He was released on November 18, but was re-signed to the practice squad on November 29. He was released on December 27.

Jacksonville Jaguars
On December 29, 2016, Coe was signed to the Jacksonville Jaguars' practice squad.

Seattle Seahawks
On January 19, 2017, Coe signed a reserve/future contract with the Seattle Seahawks. On May 9, he was released by the Seahawks. He was re-signed on July 30. He was waived on September 2. He was re-signed to the Seahawks practice squad on October 25. He was promoted to the active roster on November 28. He was waived on December 12.

Detroit Lions
On December 13, 2017, Coe was claimed off waivers by the Detroit Lions. He wasn't re-signed after the season

Personal life
His grandfather Charlie Coe had over 40 years of coaching experience in the NFL and in college. His uncle Michael Coe also played in the NFL.

References

External links
Iowa State Cyclones bio
Akron Zips bio

1993 births
Living people
People from Fulton, Missouri
American football defensive tackles
Iowa Western Reivers football players
Iowa State Cyclones football players
Akron Zips football players
Dallas Cowboys players
Tampa Bay Buccaneers players
Jacksonville Jaguars players
Seattle Seahawks players
Detroit Lions players